Copelatus duponti is a species of diving beetle. It is part of the genus Copelatus in the subfamily Copelatinae of the family Dytiscidae. It was described by Aube in 1838.

References

duponti
Beetles described in 1838